Chasity Grant (born 19 April 2001) is a Dutch professional footballer who plays as a forward for Eredivisie club Ajax and the Netherlands national team.

International career
Grant made her senior team debut for Netherlands on 19 February 2022 in a 3–0 win against Finland.

Career statistics

International

Honours
Ajax
 KNVB Women's Cup: 2021–22
 Eredivisie Cup: 2020–21

References

External links
 
Senior national team profile at Onsoranje.nl (in Dutch)
Under-23 national team profile at Onsoranje.nl (in Dutch)
Under-19 national team profile at Onsoranje.nl (in Dutch)
Under-17 national team profile at Onsoranje.nl (in Dutch)
Under-16 national team profile at Onsoranje.nl (in Dutch)

2001 births
Living people
Women's association football forwards
Dutch women's footballers
Netherlands women's international footballers
Eredivisie (women) players
ADO Den Haag (women) players
AFC Ajax (women) players
Footballers from Schiedam